Steene is a surname. Notable people with the surname include:

James Steene (died 1862), Irish-born Canadian politician
Johan Steene (born 1973), Swedish ultramarathon runner
William Steene (1887–1965), American painter

See also
Steen (surname)